The Giraldilla International is the name of an international badminton tournament, which is organized as an open championship of Cuba. The competition is held annually since 2000 and is now a young supraregional Badminton Championship. The organizer was the Cuban Badminton Association (Federación Cubana de Badminton) in cooperation with the Badminton Pan Am continental federation.

At 2013, the tournament was classified as "Future Series" by the  Badminton World Federation (BWF), since the fifteenth event in March 2014 Giraldilla classified as "International Series" level, which held on to win the tournament before $1,700 now $2,500 points for the world ranking will be credited.

The tournament is named after the unofficial symbol of the city of Havana, "La Giraldilla" is a bronze weathervane in female figure on the oldest fortress of the city, the Castillo de la Real Fuerza. Until 2012, it was held in Pinar del Río, Havana is the host city of the tournament.

The 16th edition was held in March 2015 at Havana. Registration of participants is carried out in each case solely on the WBF. On the players who reach at least the semi-finals, a staggered by ranking prize pool of currently $5,000 will be paid.

Previous winners

Performances by nation

References

External links
BWF Fansite
Torneo Internacional de Giraldilla

Badminton tournaments
Badminton tournaments in Cuba
Sports competitions in Cuba
Spring (season) events in Cuba